D&B (Dun & Bradstreet) is an American business services company, formerly listed at the  New York Stock Exchange.

D&B may also refer to:

d&b audiotechnik, a manufacturer of audio equipment
Dandelion and burdock, a drink
Dave & Buster's, a restaurant and entertainment business
Dodging and burning, a technique used during the printing process
Drum and bass, a musical genre

See also
Dab (disambiguation)
DB (disambiguation)